St. Joseph River may refer to the following streams in the U.S. state of Michigan:

 St. Joseph River (Lake Michigan), rises in Hillsdale County and flows primarily to the west into Lake Michigan
 St. Joseph River (Maumee River), rises in Hillsdale County and flows primarily southwest, joins with the St. Mary's River in Ft. Wayne, Indiana to form the Maumee River

Rivers of Michigan
Set index articles on rivers of Michigan